"Do It Like You" is a song by American rapper Diggy Simmons with a guest appearance from R&B singer Jeremih singing the chorus. It was released on October 24, 2011 as the second single from his debut album Unexpected Arrival (2012). It was co-written by both artists, along with John Maultsby, McGee, Dexter Wansel and Andrew "Pop" Wansel, who co-produced the song with producer Oak Felder. The song uses a sample of "Theme From the Planets" by Dexter Wansel.

"Do It Like You" was Diggy's first solo appearance on the US Billboard Hot 100, peaking at number 80. It also peaked at number 11 on both the US Hot R&B/Hip-Hop Songs and US Hot Rap Songs charts respectively. A music video directed by Phil the God was created for the single that featured both Diggy and Jeremih with their respective girlfriends at a carnival.

Background
"Do It Like You" was written by Diggy Simmons, Jeremih Felton, John Maultsby, McGee, Andrew "Pop" Wansel (who co-produced the song with producer Oak) and Dexter Wansel, whose song "Theme From the Planets" was used as a sample. Billboard editor Jon Blistein described the song as having "sugar-rushed synths and bubblegum snap snares." In an interview with music channel Fuse, he said that his inspiration for the song was about a girl being true to herself and not emulating someone else to attract a guy.

Music video
A video (directed by frequent collaborator Phil the God) was created for the single that took place in California. The video features both Diggy and Jeremih hanging out with friends when they spot a group of girls walking past them. Diggy is attracted to one of them and they have a date at a carnival. The video premiered on BET's 106 & Park on December 6, 2011.

Track listing

Chart performance
On the week of February 11, 2012, "Do It Like You" debuted on the Billboard Hot 100 at number 99. It moved two spots to number 97 the week of February 25 before leaving the chart. It re-appeared on the chart at number 98 for the week of March 17 and peaked at number 80 the week of April 7, staying on the chart for eight weeks.

Weekly charts

Year-end charts

References

2011 singles
2011 songs
2010s ballads
Diggy Simmons songs
Jeremih songs
Atlantic Records singles
Contemporary R&B ballads
Songs written by Dexter Wansel
Songs written by Jeremih
Songs written by Pop Wansel
Songs written by John Maultsby
Songs written by Oak Felder